In Greek mythology, Cisseus (Ancient Greek: Κισσεὺς means "wreathe with ivy") may refer to the following personages:

Cisseus, an Egyptian prince as one of the sons of King Aegyptus. His mother was the naiad Caliadne and thus full brother of Eurylochus, Phantes, Peristhenes, Hermus, Potamon, Dryas, Lixus, Imbrus, Bromius, Polyctor and Chthonius. In some accounts, he could be a son of Aegyptus either by Eurryroe, daughter of the river-god Nilus, or Isaie, daughter of King Agenor of Tyre. Cisseus suffered the same fate as his other brothers, save Lynceus, when they were slain on their wedding night by their wives who obeyed the command of their father King Danaus of Libya. He married the Danaid Antheleia, daughter of Danaus and the naiad Polyxo.
Cisseus, a Thracian king and father of Theano, the wife of Antenor, as related in Homer's Iliad.  His wife was Telecleia, a daughter of King Ilus of Troy. No mythographer (Homer included) provides any further details about this Cisseus, although Strabo suggests that he was associated with the town of Cissus in western Thrace (later Macedonia). Hecabe (Hecuba), the wife of Priam, is sometimes given as a daughter of Cisseus; but she is more usually described as a Phrygian, and daughter of King Dymas. Cisseus was remembered for giving Anchises a bowl engraved with figures as a memento and a pledge of their friendship.
 Cisseus, son of Melampus and an ally of Turnus, the man who opposed Aeneas in Italy. He was killed by Aeneas.
Cisseus, also the name of a local king, defeated by Macedonians, Perdiccas, Caranus and Archelaus in various versions of the myth. He received Archelaus and promised to give him his kingdom and his daughter but later, going back on his word, tried to kill him. But Archelaus, who is counted among the Heraclides, killed Cisseus instead.

Notes

References 

 Apollodorus, The Library with an English Translation by Sir James George Frazer, F.B.A., F.R.S. in 2 Volumes, Cambridge, MA, Harvard University Press; London, William Heinemann Ltd. 1921. ISBN 0-674-99135-4. Online version at the Perseus Digital Library. Greek text available from the same website.
Euripides, The Complete Greek Drama edited by Whitney J. Oates and Eugene O'Neill, Jr. in two volumes. 1. Hecuba, translated by E. P. Coleridge. New York. Random House. 1938. Online version at the Perseus Digital Library.
 Euripides, Euripidis Fabulae. vol. 1. Gilbert Murray. Oxford. Clarendon Press, Oxford. 1902. Greek text available at the Perseus Digital Library.
 Gaius Julius Hyginus, Fabulae from The Myths of Hyginus translated and edited by Mary Grant. University of Kansas Publications in Humanistic Studies. Online version at the Topos Text Project.
 Homer, The Iliad with an English Translation by A.T. Murray, Ph.D. in two volumes. Cambridge, MA., Harvard University Press; London, William Heinemann, Ltd. 1924. Online version at the Perseus Digital Library.
 Homer, Homeri Opera in five volumes. Oxford, Oxford University Press. 1920. Greek text available at the Perseus Digital Library.
 Maurus Servius Honoratus, In Vergilii carmina comentarii. Servii Grammatici qui feruntur in Vergilii carmina commentarii; recensuerunt Georgius Thilo et Hermannus Hagen. Georgius Thilo. Leipzig. B. G. Teubner. 1881. Online version at the Perseus Digital Library.
 Publius Vergilius Maro, Aeneid. Theodore C. Williams. trans. Boston. Houghton Mifflin Co. 1910. Online version at the Perseus Digital Library.
 Publius Vergilius Maro, Bucolics, Aeneid, and Georgics. J. B. Greenough. Boston. Ginn & Co. 1900. Latin text available at the Perseus Digital Library.

Princes in Greek mythology
Sons of Aegyptus
Mythological kings of Thrace
Kings in Greek mythology
Ancient Mygdonia
Greek mythology of Thrace
Thraco-Macedonian mythology